Dibai (also spelt as Debai) is a city and a municipal board in Bulandshahr district. It is a tehsil City and also a constituency of legislative assembly in the state of Uttar Pradesh, India. Dibai had a population of 39902 according to census 2011.

Geography
It has an average elevation of 184 metres (603 feet).

Demographics
 India census, Dibai had a population of 34,853. Males constitute 53% of the population and females 47%. Dibai has an average literacy rate of 50%, lower than the national average of 59.5%: male literacy is 58% and, female literacy is 41%. In Dibai, 16% of the population is under 6 years of age.

Notables
Intizar Hussain, eminent Urdu poet and fiction writer of Lahore, Pakistan was born in Dibai.

Hitesh Kumari, MLA from Dibai from 1985-89.

References

Cities and towns in Bulandshahr district